Goodenia filiformis, commonly known as thread-leaved goodenia,  is a species of flowering plant in the family Goodeniaceae and is endemic to near-coastal areas of south-western Western Australia. It is an erect to ascending herb with cylindrical to narrow linear leaves at the base of the plant and racemes of yellow flowers.

Description
Flowering occurs from November to December or January.

Taxonomy and naming
Goodenia filiformis was first formally described in 1810 by Robert Brown in Prodromus Florae Novae Hollandiae et Insulae Van Diemen. The specific epithet (filiformis) means "thread-shaped".

Distribution and habitat
This goodenia grows in winter-wet places in near-coastal areas between Princess Royal Harbour and West Cape Howe in the south-west of Western Australia.

Conservation status
Goodenia filiformis is classified as "not threatened" by the Government of Western Australia Department of Parks and Wildlife.

References

filiformis
Eudicots of Western Australia
Plants described in 1810
Taxa named by Robert Brown (botanist, born 1773)
Endemic flora of Southwest Australia